Robert Hayes Veach (June 29, 1888 – August 7, 1945) was an American baseball player from 1910 to 1930 including 14 seasons in the major leagues. He was the starting left fielder for the Detroit Tigers from 1912 to 1923 and also played for the Boston Red Sox (1924–1925), New York Yankees (1925) and Washington Senators (1925).

Veach hit for both power and average. He compiled a .310 career batting average and finished second to Ty Cobb for the 1919 American League batting title with a .355 average. He also led the American League in runs batted in (RBIs) three times (1915, 1917, and 1918) and was among the league leaders 10 times. Nobody in baseball had as many RBIs or extra base hits as Veach from 1915 to 1922. He is also the only player born in the state of Kentucky to have collected 2,000 hits and 1,000 RBIs. 

Veach was also among the best defensive outfielders of his era, regularly ranking among the league leaders in putouts, range factor, and fielding percentage. Despite being one of the most productive hitters in baseball during his years in Detroit, Veach played in the shadows of three Detroit outfielders who won 16 batting titles and were inducted into the Baseball Hall of Fame: Cobb in center field and Sam Crawford followed by Harry Heilmann in right field. Detroit's 1915 outfield consisting of Veach, Cobb, and Crawford has been ranked by baseball historian and statistician Bill James as the greatest outfield in history.

Early years
Veach was born in Island, Kentucky, in 1888. His family moved to Madisonville, Kentucky, when he was 12 years old. His father was a coal miner, and Veach also began working in the coal mine as a boy. In 1915, Veach recalled: "I started in as a miner when I was fourteen years old and worked at it in the winters until a couple years ago, long after I was earning money as a player."  At age 17, Veach moved to Herrin, Illinois, where he began playing semi-pro baseball.

Professional baseball career

Minor leagues

Kankakee
Veach began his professional baseball career in 1910 as a pitcher with the Peoria Distillers of the Illinois–Indiana–Iowa League. At the start of the season, he was sent to the Kankakee Kays of the Northern Association.  He compiled a 10-5 record at Kankakee and was recalled to Peoria.

Peoria
In 1911, Veach was converted from a pitcher into an outfielder.  He appeared in 132 games for Peoria, compiling a .297 batting average with 40 extra base hits.

Indianapolis
Veach began the 1912 season with Peoria, batting .325 with 24 extra base hits in the first 56 games of the season.  In July 1912, he was promoted to the Indianapolis Indians of the American Association. He remained in Indianapolis for only two months and two days before being purchased by the Detroit Tigers.

Detroit

1912–1914
In early September, Veach was purchased by Detroit from Indianapolis.  He was promptly inserted into the Tigers' lineup, replacing Davy Jones as the left fielder in an outfield that included future Baseball Hall of Famers Ty Cobb and Sam Crawford. Veach made his major league debut on September 6, 1912, at age 24. He appeared in 23 games for Detroit in 1912, compiling a .342 batting average in 79 at bats.  Veach remained the Tigers' starting left fielder for 12 years.

In 1913, as Veach adjusted to playing in the major leagues, his batting average declined to .269, but he continued to show power and speed with 22 doubles, 10 triples and 22 stolen bases. He also showed patience at the plate, drawing 53 bases on balls to boost his on-base percentage to .346.

Veach improved steadily in 1914, raising his batting average to .275. He also had 14 triples, which was the fifth best total in the American League that season, trailing teammate Sam Crawford's total of 26 triples, which remains the American League record. His 74 RBIs in 1914 also ranked ninth in the league. Veach also continued to show patience at the plate, drawing 50 bases on balls and ranking fifth in the league with an at bat to strikeout ratio of 18.1. He also showed great range in the outfield, ranking fourth among the league's outfielders with 282 putouts.

1915 season
In 1915, Veach has a breakout season, becoming one of the most dominant batters in the American League. His batting average increased by 38 points to .313, and he led the American League with 40 doubles (nine more than any other player) and 112 RBIs (tied with teammate Sam Crawford). He was also among the league leaders with 53 extra base hits (2nd), 178 hits (3rd), 247 total bases (3rd), .313 batting average (6th), .390 on-base percentage (6th), .434 slugging percentage (7th), and 68 bases on balls (10th).

Veach also performed well defensively. His 297 putouts ranked fifth among the league's outfielders, and his .975 fielding percentage also ranked fifth.

The Tigers' 1915 outfield, with Veach in left, Cobb in center, and Crawford in right has been ranked by baseball historian Bill James as the greatest outfield of all time.  During the 1915 season, Baseball Magazine published a five-page feature story on Veach, concluding that "with his advent the Detroit outfield is one of the most powerful, if not the most powerful, ever assembled on a diamond."  Though the league average batting average in 1915 was .248, Cobb hit .369 with 99 RBIs, Crawford hit .299 and drove in 112 runs, and Veach hit .313 with 112 RBIs. The three Detroit outfielders ranked #1, #2, and #3 in total bases and RBIs. The 1915 Tigers won 100 games, but finished in second place, one game behind the Boston Red Sox.

1916–1923

Veach continued his solid hitting from 1915 to 1923, batting over .306 in eight of those nine years. Veach finished among the American League leaders in hits (8 times), batting average (6 times), doubles (8 times), triples (8 times), RBIs (10 times), extra base hits (7 times), and total bases (8 times).

On June 9, 1916, Veach scored a run to end Babe Ruth's scoreless innings streak at 25. Ruth then evened the score with one of the longest home runs ever at Navin Field, deep into the right field bleachers.

Veach had his best year as a batter in 1919 when he led the American League in hits (191), doubles (41), and triples (17). Only Babe Ruth and Ty Cobb topped him in other offensive categories. His .355 batting average was second to Cobb, and his 65 extra base hits, 101 RBIs and 279 total bases were second behind Ruth.

On September 17, 1920, he became the first Detroit Tiger to hit for the cycle with six hits in a 12-inning game.

In 1921, Veach was the subject of a motivational tactic by new player-manager Cobb. Cobb believed that Veach, who came to bat with a smile and engaged in friendly conversation with umpires and opposing pitchers, was too easygoing. Tigers historian Fred Lieb described Veach as a "happy-go-lucky guy, not too brilliant above the ears", who "was as friendly as a Newfoundland pup with opponents as well as teammates". (Fred Lieb, "The Detroit Tigers") Hoping to light a fire in Veach, Cobb persuaded Harry Heilmann, who followed Veach in the batting order, to taunt Veach from the on-deck circle. "I want you to make him mad. Real mad. . . . [W]hile you're waiting, call him a yellow belly, a quitter and a dog. … Take that smile off his face". The tactic may have worked, as Veach had career-highs in RBIs (126) and home runs (16), and his batting average jumped from .308 to .338. Cobb had promised to tell Veach about the scheme when the season was over, but never did. When Heilmann tried to explain, Veach reportedly snarled, "Don't come sucking around me with that phony line". Veach never forgave Heilmann.

In the eight years from 1915 to 1922, Veach had 852 RBIs and 450 extra base hits, more than any other player. The top five in RBI during these eight years:
 Bobby Veach – 852
 Ty Cobb – 723
 Babe Ruth – 635
 George Sisler – 612
 Tris Speaker – 585

The top five in extra base hits:
 Bobby Veach – 450
 Ruth – 445
 Speaker – 444
 Cobb – 418
 Sisler – 402
Career statistics:

Note:(a) Baseball Reference and Retrosheet list his runs at 957. Baseball Almanac, The Baseball Cube and Fangraphs list his runs at 953. MLB.com list his runs at 952.
(b) Baseball Reference and Retrosheet list his RBI total at 1174. Baseball Almanac, The Baseball Cube, Fangraphs, and MLB.com list his RBI total at 1166.

Veach as a left fielder

In addition to his batting skills, Veach's speed and strong arm made him a fine left fielder. He led the American League in games played in left field seven times (1914–1915, 1917–1918, and 1920–1922). He led the American League in putouts by an outfielder in 1921 with 384. He also led the league in assists with 26 in 1920.

Veach's 206 career assists and 2.28 range factor are among the top 10 in Major League history for left fielders. Though left fielders generally receive fewer fielding chances than other outfielders, Veach regularly covered more ground and accepted more chances than the league average for all outfielders. His 1921 range factor of 2.72 is one of the highest season totals for a left fielder in Major League history. His 384 putouts in 1921 and 26 assists in 1920 are also among the highest by a left fielder since 1900.

Veach's range as an outfielder is also shown by a comparison with Ty Cobb, the center fielder he played beside for most of his career. In 1914, Veach had 282 putouts and 22 assists, compared to 177 and 8 for Cobb.  Though center fielders typically receive more chances, and Cobb had a reputation as a fine center fielder, Veach bested Cobb in chances in seven of the nine years they played side by side in the Detroit outfield: 1914 (304–185), 1916 (356–343), 1918 (291–237), 1919 (352–291), 1920 (383–254), 1921 (405–328), and 1922 (391–344).

Boston and New York

In 1923, Veach continued to hit for average at .321, but his RBI production dropped to 39. In January 1924, the Tigers sold Veach to the Boston Red Sox. That year, Veach regained his power, hitting 99 RBIs and 49 extra base hits.

In May 1925, the Red Sox traded Veach to the New York Yankees. Veach played 56 games for the Yankees, batting .353 with a .474 slugging percentage. On August 9, 1925, in his final season, Veach became one of two players to pinch hit for Babe Ruth in the years after Babe switched from a pitcher to an outfielder. The Chicago Tribune reported the next day: "The fans were treated to the unusual spectacle of His Royal Highness being yanked for a pinch hitter."

Washington
The Yankees released Veach less than two weeks later, and Veach was picked up by the Washington Senators. This proved to be good luck for Veach, as the Senators won the 1925 pennant. On September 19, 1925, Veach broke up Ted Lyons's bid for a no-hitter with a two-out ninth-inning single. The young Goose Goslin got the start for the Senators at left field, but Veach got one at bat in the World Series pinch-hitting for Muddy Ruel in Game 2. Fittingly, Veach collected an RBI on a sacrifice fly in his final Major League at bat.

Toledo
After ending his Major League career in 1925, Veach played four seasons with the Toledo Mud Hens of the American Association from 1926 to 1929. In 1927, a 39-year-old Veach led the Mud Hens (with manager Casey Stengel) to their first American Association crown with a 101–67 record. Veach had a .363 batting average and drove in a league-leading 145 RBIs. The next year, at age 40, Veach hit .382 to capture the 1928 American Association batting crown.

Later years

In December 1943, Veach underwent an abdominal operation at Grace Hospital in Detroit. Veach died in 1945 at his home in Detroit after a long illness at the age of 57. Veach was survived by his wife and three sons. Veach was buried at White Chapel Memorial Park Cemetery in Troy, Michigan.

See also

 List of Major League Baseball career hits leaders
 List of Major League Baseball career triples leaders
 List of Major League Baseball career runs batted in leaders
 List of Major League Baseball career stolen bases leaders
 List of Major League Baseball annual runs batted in leaders
 List of Major League Baseball annual doubles leaders
 List of Major League Baseball annual triples leaders
 List of Major League Baseball single-game hits leaders
 List of Major League Baseball players to hit for the cycle

References

Further reading

External links

1888 births
1945 deaths
Major League Baseball left fielders
Detroit Tigers players
Boston Red Sox players
New York Yankees players
Washington Senators (1901–1960) players
Baseball players from Kentucky
American League RBI champions
Peoria Distillers players
Indianapolis Indians players
Toledo Mud Hens players
Jersey City Skeeters players
People from Herrin, Illinois
Kankakee Kays players